Brian Carroll (born July 20, 1981) is an American retired soccer player who last played for Philadelphia Union in Major League Soccer. He is currently the only player in MLS history to have won 4 consecutive Supporter Shields.

Career

Youth and college
While in high school, Carroll was the Washington Post All-Met Player of the Year, was twice named to the Parade All-American team, and led the West Springfield Spartans to the final of the Virginia state tournament in 1998. He played college soccer at Wake Forest University from 2000 to 2002. Named captain as a sophomore, Carroll tied the school record for most assists in a game with three and finished the year as a second-team All-ACC selection. As a junior, he was again team captain, an All-American, and was a finalist for the Hermann Trophy. After his junior year, he signed a Project-40 contract with MLS, completing his career at Wake Forest with 7 goals and 15 assists, having started all 61 games over the three years.

Club

DC United
Carroll was selected 11th overall in the 2003 MLS SuperDraft by D.C. United. Unfortunately for him, coach Ray Hudson preferred a lineup dominated by veterans, and although he saw time in U.S. Open Cup competition, Carroll did not appear in any regular season games. Peter Nowak replaced Hudson following the 2003 season, and soon expressed incredulity that a player as talented as Carroll saw no playing time under Hudson. Carroll was a fixture in Nowak's lineup for the first game of the 2004 season, and would remain there all year long, appearing in all 30 of the team's games, starting 26 of them, earning his first MLS assist, and winning the MLS Cup. In 2005, he led the team in minutes and games played, scored his first league goal, added three more assists, and led MLS in consecutive games played, at 62. Carroll was one of three players nominated for the 2005 MLS Fair Play Award.  Carroll started 31 games for the club in 2006, with 1 goal and 3 assists.  Carroll lost his starting role with United to fellow defensive midfielder Clyde Simms midway through the 2007 season, but still had a productive year, with 4 assists to his credit.
It was announced on 27 November 2006 that Carroll was on trial with French club  Olympique de Marseille with hopes for an eventual transfer. However, on 23 January 2007 it was announced that Carroll had re-signed with D.C. United.

Columbus Crew
On November 21, 2007, Carroll was selected as part of the expansion draft to join the new San Jose Earthquakes club. On November 26, he was traded to the Columbus Crew in exchange for Kei Kamara.

In June 2010, Caroll signed a four-year contract extension with the Crew. On November 6, 2010, he missed the penalty which ended the Crew's playoff run, sending the ball over the crossbar.

Philadelphia Union
On November 22, 2010, Carroll was traded to Philadelphia Union in exchange for a second-round draft pick and allocation money.

Between 2004 and 2016 he made at least 21 appearances for 13 different seasons. Upon retirement he was praised for his professionalism and leadership.

International
Carroll has played on the Under-18, Under-20, and Under-23 national teams, including at the 2001 FIFA World Youth Championship in Argentina and 2003 Olympic Qualifying. In his first game for the full national team (a World Cup qualifier vs. Panama on October 12, 2005), he was named Man of the Match. He ended his career with eight caps.

Career statistics

Club

International

Personal
Carroll is the brother of fellow former professional soccer players Jeff Carroll and Pat Carroll, both of whom have also played for D.C. United. He is a lifelong Catholic whose soccer career has been influenced by former UCLA basketball coach John Wooden.

Following retirement Carroll was planning to move to the Indianapolis area to pursue a career in financial planning.

Honors

D.C. United
MLS Cup (1): 2004
Eastern Conference (Playoffs) (1): 2004
Supporter's Shield (2): 2006, 2007

Columbus Crew
MLS Cup (1): 2008
Eastern Conference (Playoffs) (1): 2008
Supporter's Shield (2): 2008, 2009

Gallery

References

External links

Wake Forest bio

1981 births
Living people
American soccer players
Wake Forest Demon Deacons men's soccer players
D.C. United players
Richmond Kickers players
Columbus Crew players
Philadelphia Union players
Philadelphia Union II players
Sportspeople from Fairfax County, Virginia
United States men's international soccer players
A-League (1995–2004) players
Major League Soccer players
Soccer players from Virginia
United States men's youth international soccer players
United States men's under-20 international soccer players
United States men's under-23 international soccer players
D.C. United draft picks
People from Springfield, Virginia
Association football midfielders